Charles Coulton was an English professional footballer who played as a full back.

Coulton signed for Lincoln City after Birmingham St George disbanded, he played in the first 12 matches in the 1892–93 season before being dropped, he was a brother of Frank Coulton who played for Aston Villa.

References

English footballers
Association football defenders
Lincoln City F.C. players
English Football League players
Year of death missing
Year of birth missing
Birmingham St George's F.C. players